Ördekhacı is a village in the Otlukbeli District of Erzincan Province in Turkey.

References

Villages in Otlukbeli District